Ben van der Voort (7 October 1914 – 12 March 2002) was a Dutch cyclist. He competed in the team pursuit event at the 1936 Summer Olympics.

See also
 List of Dutch Olympic cyclists

References

External links
 

1914 births
2002 deaths
Dutch male cyclists
Olympic cyclists of the Netherlands
Cyclists at the 1936 Summer Olympics
Sportspeople from Utrecht (city)
Cyclists from Utrecht (province)